Maquassi Hills Local Municipality is a local municipality in Dr Kenneth Kaunda District Municipality, North West Province, South Africa.

Main places
The 2001 census divided the municipality into the following main places:

Politics 

The municipal council consists of twenty-two members elected by mixed-member proportional representation. Eleven are elected by first-past-the-post voting in eleven wards, while the remaining eleven are chosen from party lists so that the total number of party representatives is proportional to the number of votes received. In the election of 1 November 2021 the African National Congress (ANC) won a majority of thirteen seats on the council.

The following table shows the results of the 2021 election.

References

Website: https://web.archive.org/web/20170621102351/http://maquassihills.org/

Local municipalities of the Dr Kenneth Kaunda District Municipality